Carrickfergus Castle (from the Irish Carraig Ḟergus or "cairn of Fergus", the name "Fergus" meaning "strong man") is a Norman castle in Northern Ireland, situated in the town of Carrickfergus in County Antrim, on the northern shore of Belfast Lough. Besieged in turn by the Scottish, native Irish, English, and French, the castle played an important military role until 1928 and remains one of the best preserved medieval structures in Northern Ireland. It was strategically useful, with 3/4 of the castle perimeter surrounded by water (although in modern times only 1/3 is surrounded by water due to land reclamation). Today it is maintained by the Northern Ireland Environment Agency as a state care historic monument, at grid ref: J4143 8725.

Origins
Carrickfergus was built by John de Courcy in 1177 as his headquarters, after he conquered eastern Ulster and ruled as a petty king until 1204, when he was ousted by another Norman adventurer, Hugh de Lacy. Initially de Courcy built the inner ward, a small bailey at the end of the promontory with a high polygonal curtain wall and east gate. It had several buildings, including the great hall. From its strategic position on a rocky promontory, originally almost surrounded by sea, the castle commanded Carrickfergus Bay (later known as Belfast Lough), and the land approaches into the walled town that developed beneath its shadow.

English control

Lord Edmund Savage of the Ards was Seneschal of Ulster and Constable of Carrickfergus Castle in the late 14th century under Richard II. The castle also appears in the official English records in 1430 when King John laid siege to it and took control of what was then Ulster's premier strategic garrison. Following its capture, constables were appointed to command the castle and the surrounding area. In 1217 the new constable, De Serlane, was assigned one hundred pounds to build a new curtain wall so that the approach along the rock could be protected, as well as the eastern approaches over the sand exposed at low tide. The middle-ward curtain wall was later reduced to ground level in the eighteenth century, save along the seaward side, where it survives with a postern gate and the east tower, notable for a fine array of cross-bow loops at basement level.

A chamber on the first floor of the east tower is believed to have been the castle's chapel on account of its fine Romanesque-style double window surround, though the original chapel must have been in the inner ward. The ribbed vault over the entrance passage, the murder hole and the massive portcullis at either end of the gatehouse are later insertions started by Hugh de Lacey who died in 1248 and did not live to see its completion in around 1250. It was finished by King Henry III.

After the collapse of the Earldom of Ulster in 1333, the castle remained the Crown's principal residential and administrative centre in the north of Ireland. During the early stages of the Nine Years War (1595–1603), when English influence in the north became tenuous,
crown forces were supplied and maintained through the town's port. And in 1597, the surrounding country was the scene for the Battle of Carrickfergus.

During the sixteenth and seventeenth centuries improvements were made to accommodate artillery, including externally splayed gunports and embrasures for cannon, though these improvements did not prevent the castle from being attacked and captured on many occasions during this time. Marshal Schomberg besieged and took the castle in the week-long Siege of Carrickfergus in 1689. This is also the place where Schomberg's leader, King William III first set foot in Ireland on 14 June 1690.

In 1760, after fierce fighting in the town, it was surrendered to French invaders under the command of Francois Thurot. They looted the castle and town and then left, only to be caught by the Royal Navy.

Later use

In 1778, a small but significant event in the American War of Independence began at Carrickfergus, when John Paul Jones, in the face of reluctance by his crew to approach too close to the Castle, lured a Royal Navy vessel from its moorings into the North Channel, and won an hour-long battle. In 1797 the Castle, which had on various occasions been used to house prisoners of war, became a prison and it was heavily defended during the Napoleonic Wars; six guns on the east battery remain of the twenty-two that were used in 1811.

For a century it remained a magazine and armoury. During the First World War it was used as a garrison and ordnance store and during the Second World War as an air raid shelter.

It was garrisoned continuously for about 750 years until 1928, when its ownership was transferred from the British Army to the new Government of Northern Ireland for preservation as an ancient monument. Many of its post-Norman and Victorian additions were then removed to restore the castle's original Norman appearance. It remains open to the public. The banqueting hall has been fully restored and there are many exhibits to show what life was like in medieval times. It was built and re-built three times, and still stands today.

On the day of his wedding, 29 April 2011, Prince William of Wales was created Duke of Cambridge, Earl of Strathearn, and Baron Carrickfergus. The latter title of peerage, along with the geographical barony itself, had been extinct since Victorian times. The title is now only ceremonial with no official connection to the castle.

Governors of Carrickfergus
Governors of the garrison at Carrickfergus included:
1568: William Piers
1597: Sir John Chichester (killed near Ballycarry in 1597)
1599: Sir Arthur Chichester (created The 1st Baron Chichester in 1613; died in 1625)
1606–: Sir Faithful Fortescue and Roger Langford
1625–1648: The 1st Viscount Chichester
1648: The 1st Earl of Donegall (replaced)
1648: General George Monck (for Parliament)
1649–1650: Thomas Dalzell of Binns
1660–1675: The 1st Earl of Donegall (restored)
1675–1687: The 2nd Earl of Donegall
1689: Charles Macarty Moore
1716: Lord Mark Kerr
1728–1732: The 1st Baron Conway
1763: Nehemiah Donnellan
8 September 1787: Francis Dundas
30 January 1817 – 13 November 1828: Sir Baldwin Leighton
1 December 1828 – 22 January 1830: General George Moncrieff.
12 February 1830 – 10 June 1841: Lieutenant-General Sir William Hutchinson, K.C.H. (1765–1845) 
The post of Governor was abolished in 1841.

Railway access
The castle is short walk from Carrickfergus railway station. Trains connect west to Belfast Lanyon Place and Belfast Great Victoria Street and east to Whitehead and Larne Harbour operated by Northern Ireland Railways.

See also
 Castles in Great Britain and Ireland
 List of castles in Ireland

References

External links

 Carrickfergus Castle Visitor Information on discovernorthernireland.com

1177 establishments in Ireland
Buildings and structures completed in 1177
12th-century fortifications
Castles in County Antrim
Carrickfergus
Historic house museums in Northern Ireland
Museums in County Antrim
Northern Ireland Environment Agency properties
Norman architecture in Ireland
Norman architecture in the United Kingdom
Earldom of Ulster
George Monck, 1st Duke of Albemarle